The Upper Western District is  a subregion of the Colombian Department of Caldas.

Supía (Capital)
Filadelfia
La Merced
Marmato
Riosucio

References 

Subregions of Caldas Department